Yoon Kye-sang (born December 20, 1978) is a South Korean actor and singer. He began his career in 1999 as part of the K-pop boy band g.o.d, then left the group in 2004 and pursued an acting career. He made his acting debut in the film Flying Boys (2004), for which he won Best New Actor at the Baeksang Arts Awards. Yoon became active in both television and film, with leading roles in romantic comedies such as My 19 Year Old Sister-in-Law (2004) and Who Are You? (2008) and the melodrama Crazy for You (2007), as well as more serious fare in The Moonlight of Seoul (2008) and The Executioner (2009). After a supporting turn in the hit series The Greatest Love (2011), he returned to the big screen in the well-received indie Poongsan (2011).

Career

1999–2004: Pop star beginnings
In 1997 Yoon answered an advertisement for Park Joon-hyung's project music group and had auditioned with aspirations of becoming a rock star. Along with Danny Ahn, Son Ho-young, Kim Sun-a and producer and singer-songwriter Park Jin-young, the group was initially called "GOT6". Kim Sun-a left to pursue acting and was replaced by Kim Tae-woo. The group became a five-member boy band called g.o.d, short for "Groove Over Dose", and debuted in January 1999. Despite the lukewarm response to their debut performance, the group would go on to establish themselves as one of the most popular boy bands of the early 2000s. However, Yoon left the band in 2004 and went into acting, making his film debut in Flying Boys, directed by Byun Young-joo. He made his television debut that same year in My 19 Year Old Sister-in-Law with Jung Da-bin.

The group would release their seventh and final album before going on indefinite hiatus in December 2005 and some of the group's fans called Yoon a "traitor" and blamed him for "breaking up the group". Various media outlets speculated that there was a rift amongst the members and that he had turned his back on them in favor of acting, rumors that Yoon and the other four members chose not to publicly confirm or deny. He has since clarified in his 2012 cooking show Yoon Kye-sang's One Table that he left the group with the intention of leaving the entertainment industry altogether as he had begun to detest the spotlight, but stumbled upon an opportunity to try acting and enjoyed it.

Military service
Having just departed from g.o.d, Yoon was at the height of his popularity, but had to interrupt his nascent acting career due to mandatory military service. He enlisted in the Republic of Korea Army on December 7, 2004, and was assigned to the 102nd Reserves at Chuncheon, Gangwon Province, on the Korean Demilitarized Zone. After completing basic training and serving there for some time, Yoon was reassigned in 2006 to duties as an "entertainment soldier" in the newly formed group Korean Forces Network, which provides television and radio broadcasts to soldiers, and also allows celebrities to maintain a public profile while completing their military service. He was discharged from the army on December 6, 2006. In an interview that day, he said that he had not slept the night before and was very tired, but looked forward to seeing his fans; he further stated that he planned to resume his career in 2007.

As late as June 2011, his military service still earned him public attention, when a round-cheeked photo of him in uniform "went viral" among South Korean internet users. The photos received many amused comments for his then-fat cheeks, forming a sharp contrast with his more recent appearance.

2004 – Present: Acting career
In January 2007, Yoon returned to show business in the television drama Crazy in Love (also known as Crazy for You); he portrayed a gangster who falls in love with the widow (Lee Mi-yeon) of a man he'd accidentally killed. The following year, he and Kim Ha-neul were cast in Lovers of Six Years, playing a couple in a six-year relationship. According to Kim, her initial perception of Yoon was that he was very shy, whereas Yoon perceived Kim as snobby, so it took them some time to break the ice and establish a good working relationship. Later that year, he took a dual role in the comedy television series Who Are You?, playing a cold-hearted corporate raider who, in the aftermath of a traffic accident, becomes possessed by the spirit of a cheerful deliveryman for a few hours each day. At the same time he took a starring role opposite Ha Jung-woo in Beastie Boys (also known as The Moonlight of Seoul), portraying a worker in a host club; The Korea Times movie review praised him for his "gripping performance."

In 2009, he left his agency SidusHQ and joined My Name Is Entertainment. After doing a lighter role in the slice-of-life drama Triple, Yoon starred in the movie The Executioner, which examined capital punishment in South Korea; it debuted at the 14th Busan International Film Festival. Yoon played the role of a junior prison guard who takes up his post after failing an examination, and unluckily finds himself assigned to carry out executions after the only other guard in the prison with such experience quits. Just before the movie came out, he made controversial remarks in an interview with GQ Korea stating that the South Korean movie industry was dominated by leftists. As controversy rose among internet users over his remarks, he quickly made an apology for what he described as his "ignorance." He also became part of the ensemble cast in Come, Closer, a 2010 omnibus feature that follows the broken relationships of five couples.

After his highly anticipated big-budget Korean War drama Road No. 1, tanked in the ratings, Yoon said he wanted to play a character "who gets loved by the public" and took on a supporting role as a sweet, kind doctor in romantic comedy The Greatest Love.

The drama's success and Yoon's popularity in it helped bring attention to his next project, the low-budget, gritty indie Poongsan. Director Juhn Jai-hong fought to cast Yoon against type as the titular taciturn messenger, saying that he'd been impressed by the piercing gaze Yoon had shown in previous films. Calling it "a meaningful project," Yoon enjoyed the difficult acting challenge of telling the story only through his eyes, facial expressions and body movements. He was recognized with Best Actor nominations from the 2011 Grand Bell Awards and Blue Dragon Film Awards.

After starring in the third season of popular sitcom High Kick!, he was cast in the action thriller The Suspect, but withdrew when co-star Choi Min-sik backed out. He also pulled out from Acting Class when the big-screen comedy encountered pre-production delays.

In May 2012, he transferred to a new agency, A List Entertainment. Then Yoon and close friend, actor Kwon Se-in (who uses the stage name Kwon Yul) filmed the reality/travelogue program Real Mate in Sydney for seven days and six nights. Kwon also appeared on Yoon Kye-sang's One Table, a reality show on cable channel O'live that helped fulfill Yoon's dream of owning a restaurant. After honing his cooking skills and learning culinary secrets, Yoon prepared a feast for his former band members g.o.d on the show's season finale; it was also the first time in eight years all five members of g.o.d appeared on television together.

Yoon then appeared in Kim Jee-woon's short film One Perfect Day in 2013. He also starred in a Chinese film titled Hello My Love, which premiered online and garnered over 100 million hits.

Yoon then signed with a new talent agency, Saram Entertainment.

2014–present: Reunion with g.o.d and later projects
In early 2014 it was announced that g.o.d's  original five members would be reuniting to celebrate the band's 15th anniversary. It also marked Yoon's return to the music industry after a decade. They released their eighth album in July and afterwards embarked on a successful nationwide concert tour. Yoon wrote the lyrics for the song "Wind" (바람), which was released after the conclusion of their nationwide tour as a gesture of gratitude to fans.

In 2014, Yoon starred in the melodrama series The Full Sun, in which he played a con man who enters a complicated romance with a jewelry heiress. This was followed by the romantic comedy film Red Carpet, in the role of an adult film director who dreams of making his first commercial feature.

Minority Opinion (also known as The Unfair), Yoon's film where he played a public defender whose client is accused of killing a riot policeman during a forced demolition, which had wrapped filming in 2013, finally received a theatrical release in 2015. He next starred in Last, a cable series based on Kang Hyung-kyu's webtoon about a fund manager whose financial ruin leads to life among the homeless living underground at Seoul Station, followed by Love Guide for Dumpees (titled A Dramatic Night in Korean), a play-turned-movie about a man and woman who agree to be casual lovers but end up finding something more.

In 2016, Yoon was cast in the Korean remake of American television series The Good Wife. Yoon then played a disabled man in the film The Bacchus Lady, a bittersweet drama about an elderly prostitute helmed by E J-yong.

Yoon played a villain role in crime noir The Outlaws, which premiered in late 2017. He next starred in the thriller Golden Slumber, playing a friend of the protagonist tasked to chase him down.

In 2019, Yoon starred in Mal-Mo-E: The Secret Mission, which depicts two men who travel the country to collect Korean words in secret in 1910. The same year, he was cast in the fantasy action film Fluid Renegade.

Personal life
Yoon is the youngest of two siblings in his family. He describes having been very embarrassed as a young boy when he ran errands for his mother and elder sister, such as buying tampons for them at the store.

In December 2000, Yoon, then a member of g.o.d, received a poisoned drink from a supposed fan. Yoon's mother drank the drink and had to have her stomach pumped.

Yoon and three friends opened the first cereal café bar in Seoul called Midnight in Seoul which has since become a franchise. The initially small venture became popular on social media within South Korea due to its popularity with K-pop idol singers who frequented the place and posted pictures online. Entertainer and 2AM member Jo Kwon became president of the franchise while Yoon and his friends remain the owners and still run the original café. Midnight in Seoul officially closed in October 2018.

In an interview with GQ Korea in April 2021, Yoon revealed that he had suffered a brain aneurysm and underwent urgent endovascular coiling surgery the year before in 2020.

Relationship and marriage 
In February 2013, Yoon's agency confirmed his relationship with Lee Ha-nui, a South Korean actress, model, classical musician, gayageum player and a beauty pageant titleholder. On June 11, 2020, it was confirmed that both have broken up.

In June 2021, Yoon's agency confirmed that he was in a relationship with a non-celebrity. In August 2021, Yoon's agency stated that Yoon is going to marry his non-celebrity girlfriend. By registering the marriage first because it is difficult to arrange a wedding because of the Covid-19 situation. On August 13, 2021, Yoon registered his marriage with his girlfriend.

On April 18, 2022, it was confirmed that Yoon will officially marry his wife on June 9, 2022.

Filmography

Film

Television series

Web series

Television shows

Web shows

Discography

Awards and nominations

References

External links
 Yoon Kye-sang at Just Entertainment 
 
 
 

1978 births
Living people
G.o.d (South Korean band) members
21st-century South Korean male actors
21st-century South Korean singers
IHQ (company) artists
JYP Entertainment artists
Male actors from Seoul
Singers from Seoul
South Korean male film actors
South Korean male idols
South Korean male singers
South Korean male television actors
South Korean pop singers
Best New Actor Paeksang Arts Award (film) winners